Josephine Moody Luthe was one of Colorado's first two female lawyers.

Luthe was born in Cedar Rapids, Iowa on March 4, 1856. Following the death of her first husband, Luthe initially oversaw the art department of Coe College in Cedar Rapids before relocating to Denver, Colorado. She was initially going to relocate again to El Paso, Texas in order to serve as a secretary for a judicial officer, but decided to remain in Denver upon the death of one of her prospective employers. She and Mary Sternberg Thomas became the first women admitted to practice law in Colorado on September 14, 1891. At the time of her admission, Luthe was already married to her second husband Judge Herman E. Luthe. She later practiced as a lawyer in New York City and Los Angeles, California.

See also 

 List of first women lawyers and judges in Colorado

References 

Colorado lawyers
1856 births
Year of death missing
19th-century American women lawyers
19th-century American lawyers